Cogley Wood is a 60.7 hectare biological Site of Special Scientific Interest east of Bruton in Somerset, notified in 1987.

The name is believed to be from cock ley meaning a clearing with birds.

The wood is situated on the eastern slopes of the upper reaches of the Brue valley, with several of its tributaries having their sources in the wood which is made up of two extensive areas of species-rich, semi-natural ancient woodland with an exceptionally rich butterfly fauna. 

The trees include ash (Fraxinus excelsior), pedunculate oak (Quercus robur), wych elm (Ulmus glabra) and wild cherry (Prunus avium). Beneath them are dog's mercury (Mercurialis perennis) and common bluebell (Hyacinthoides non-scripta). Other plants of interest include greater butterfly-orchid (Platanthera chlorantha) and meadow saffron (Colchicum autumnale).

36 species of resident breeding butterflies have been recorded including marsh fritillary (Euphydryas aurinia), high brown fritillary (Argynnis cydippe), brown hairstreak (Thecla betulae), Duke of Burgundy (Hamearis lucina) and purple emperor (Apatura iris).

References

External links
 English Nature website (SSSI information)

Sites of Special Scientific Interest in Somerset
Sites of Special Scientific Interest notified in 1987
Woodland Sites of Special Scientific Interest
Forests and woodlands of Somerset
Bruton